V. S. S. Mani Chettiyar was an Indian politician and former Member of the Legislative Assembly of Tamil Nadu. He was elected to the Tamil Nadu legislative assembly as a Dravida Munnetra Kazhagam candidate from Athoor constituency in 1962, and 1967 elections.

References 

Dravida Munnetra Kazhagam politicians
Year of birth missing
Possibly living people
Madras MLAs 1962–1967
Tamil Nadu MLAs 1967–1972